Veigas is one of fifteen parishes (administrative divisions) in Somiedo, a municipality within the province and autonomous community of Asturias, in northern Spain.  

The postal code is 33840.

Villages
 Escobio (L'Escobiu)
 La Falguera
 La Llamera
 Veigas
 Villarín

Parishes in Somiedo